George Tintle (December 24, 1892 in Harrison, New Jersey – January 14, 1975 in Harrison, New Jersey) was a U.S. soccer goalkeeper who played the first two U.S. national team games in 1916.  He spent at least ten seasons in the National Association Football League and two in the first American Soccer League.  He is a member of the National Soccer Hall of Fame.

Professional
In 1908, Tintle began his professional career with the Harrison Alley Boys.  He remained with the Alley Boys until 1914.  He then played with Independent F.C. of Harrison. He spent at least one season, 1916–1917; with Brooklyn Celtic before entering the U.S. Army for World War I.  In addition to playing for Celtic, Tintle also went on loan to the Alley Boys during the spring of 1916.  After returning from service with the 29th Division in France in 1919 joined Bethlehem Steel for a Scandinavian tour..  He then spent a single season with Paterson F.C. and one season, 1920–1921, with Erie A.A.  When the American Soccer League replaced the NAFBL in 1921, Tintle spent two seasons with Harrison S.C.

National team
Tintle earned two caps with the national team in 1916.  In the first official U.S. national team game, the U.S. defeated Sweden on August 20, 1916.  On September 3, 1916, Tintle and his team mates tied Norway before returning to the U.S.

Coaching
Tintle coached Harrison High School after retiring from playing professionally.  According to the Soccer Hall of Fame, his team went seven seasons undefeated.

He was inducted into the National Soccer Hall of Fame in 1953.

External links
 National Soccer Hall of Fame profile

1892 births
1975 deaths
Association football goalkeepers
United States men's international soccer players
National Association Football League players
Harrison Alley Boys players
Brooklyn Celtic (NAFBL) players
Paterson F.C. players
American Soccer League (1921–1933) players
Erie A.A. players
Harrison S.C. players
National Soccer Hall of Fame members
People from Harrison, New Jersey
Sportspeople from Hudson County, New Jersey
Soccer players from New Jersey
American soccer players